Klaudia Krystyna Jachira (born 31 May 1988) is a Polish politician, actress, comedian and YouTuber. She is a member of the Sejm (9th term) since 2019.

Biography

As actress and comedian
In 2008, Jachira graduated from the "L'Art Studio" Post-secondary School of Acting in Krakow, and in 2013 she graduated from the Puppetry Department in Wrocław of the AST National Academy of Theatre Arts in Kraków. She has appeared in individual episodes of various TV series, e.g. Na Wspólnej, Przyjaciółki, Pierwsza miłość.

Since 2015, she has been running the channel on the YouTube platform, posting satirical and journalistic recordings. In published materials, she criticized among others the actions of Law and Justice and the president of this party Jarosław Kaczyński, as well as part of the Catholic clergy. Her recordings and public appearances (including during the election campaign in 2019) have often been described as controversial.

Political career
In 2015, Jachira ran unsuccessfully in parliamentary elections to the Sejm from sixth place on the list of Nowoczesna Ryszard Petru in Wrocław, winning 629 votes.

In the parliamentary election in 2019, she was elected a deputy to the Sejm of the 9th term from the list of the Civic Coalition.

See also
Politics of Poland

References

External links
 

1988 births
Living people
Members of the Polish Sejm 2019–2023
Polish television actresses
Polish YouTubers
Polish comedians
Actors from Wrocław
21st-century Polish politicians
21st-century Polish women politicians
Politicians from Wrocław
Polish actor-politicians